900 or variation, may refer to:

Numbers
 900 (number), a number in the 900s range
 900 telephone number, an area code in North America reserved for additional charge calling

Time
 AD 900, a year in the first millennium of the Common Era
 900 BC, a year in the first millennium Before Common Era
 900s (decade) AD, a decade in the first millennium of the Common Era
 900s BC (decade), a decade in the first millennium Before Common Era
 900s (century) AD, a century in the first millennium of the Common Era
 900s BC (century), a century in the first millennium Before Common Era
 9/00, September 2000
 9/00, September 1900

Places
 900 Rosalinde (1918 EC), a main-belt asteroid, the 900th asteroid registered
 highway 900, several roads
 Căile Ferate Române Line 900, the 900 line operated by Căile Ferate Române, a rail line in Romania

Legislation
 Decree 900, Guatemalan land reform law of 1952
 H.R. 900, the Puerto Rico Democracy Act, a federal bill in the United States, 2007

Military
Ships with pennant number 900
 , a Royal Netherlands Navy submarine support ship
 , a WWII U.S. Navy tank landingship

Products
 Astra Model 900, a semiautomatic pistol
 Commodore 900, a microcomputer

Vehicles
 Bréguet 900 Louisette, a sailplane
 GMT900, a General Motors full-size pickup truck
 GS&WR Class 900, a locomotive class
 MD 900, a model of helicopter from McDonnell Douglas Helicopters
 Saab 900, a midsized automobile
 South Australian Railways 900 class, a locomotive class

Other uses
 900MHz (33cm), a UHF band
 UMTS 900, a frequency band for cellular telephony
 900 AM (900kHz; 333m), a radio station frequency
 900 (skateboarding), a 900° spin, also found in skiing and snowboarding
 900 mm gauge railways

See also

 
 1-900 (disambiguation)
 900 series (disambiguation)
 900s (disambiguation)
 C900 (disambiguation)
 E900 (disambiguation)
 P900 (disambiguation)
 S900 (disambiguation)
 V900 (disambiguation)
 W900 (disambiguation)